Chintamani Maharaj  is an MLA in Chhattisgarh from The Indian National Congress.

Political career
He became a first time MLA in the Chhattisgarh Legislative Assembly from Lundra.

See also
Chhattisgarh Legislative Assembly
2013 Chhattisgarh Legislative Assembly election

References

External links

https://www.patrika.com/tags/lundra-mla-chintamani-maharaj/

Indian National Congress politicians from Chhattisgarh
1962 births
Living people